The 2006 Canadian Senior Curling Championships were held March 25-April 1 at the Silver Fox Curling Club in Summerside, Prince Edward Island. The winning teams represented Canada at the 2007 World Senior Curling Championships.

Men's

Teams

Standings

Results

Draw 1

Draw 2

Draw 3

Draw 4

Draw 5

Draw 6

Draw 7

Draw 8

Draw 9

Draw 10

Draw 11

Draw 13

Draw 15

Draw 17

Draw 19

Draw 21

Playoffs

Tiebreaker

Semifinal

Final

Women's

Teams

Standings

Results

Draw 1

Draw 2

Draw 3

Draw 4

Draw 5

Draw 6

Draw 7

Draw 8

Draw 9

Draw 10

Draw 12

Draw 14

Draw 16

Draw 18

Draw 20

Draw 22

Playoffs

Semifinal

Final

References

Men's Archived Statistics 
Women's Archived Statistics 

2006
Senior Curling Championships
Sport in Summerside, Prince Edward Island
Curling competitions in Prince Edward Island
2006 in Prince Edward Island
March 2006 sports events in Canada
April 2006 sports events in Canada